Adolf Strongarm or Adolf Armstrong (Swedish: Adolf Armstarke) is a 1937 Swedish historical comedy film directed by Sigurd Wallén and starring Adolf Jahr, Weyler Hildebrand and Georg Rydeberg. It was shot at the Råsunda Studios in Stockholm. The film's sets were designed by the art director Allan Egnell.

Synopsis
A mild-mannered Swedish university professor dreams that he has been transported back to the Middle Ages and is a noble knight fighting villains and wooing a beautiful lady.

Cast
 Adolf Jahr as 	Adolf Turesson / Adolf Armstarke of Thureholm
 Weyler Hildebrand as 	Göran Göransson / Göran Göransson Tre Stånkor
 Georg Rydeberg as Georg Ankarhjelm / Knight Georg of Ankarshus
 Theodor Berthels as Wholesaler Larsson / Merchant Larsonius
 Alice Skoglund as 	Britta Larsson / Birgitta Larsonius
 Kate Thunman as 	Eufemia Larsson / Eufemia Larsonius
 James Westheimer as 	Olof Olsson / Pater Olaus
 Ludde Juberg as 	Professor / Antonius
 Olle Hilding as 	Henriksson / Henrik Mjölnare
 Stina Ståhle as 	Lena / Magdalena
 Eivor Engelbrektsson as 	Karin, waitress / Maid
 Richard Lund as 	Enögde galten / Knight Kristoffer
 Sigge Fürst as 	Christianity Teacher / Bandit leader
 Emil Fjellström as 	Folke Niklasson / Niklas Skäggfager
 Signhild Björkman as 	Maid 
 Artur Cederborgh as 	Inn keeper 
 Eddie Figge as 	Member of the audience at the lecture 
 Carl Harald as 	Bandit 
 John Hilke as 	Knight at Ankarshus 
 Olle Jansson as 	Knight at Ankarshus 
 Herman Lantz as 	Guest at Den Gyldene Freden / Bandit 
 Sven Löfgren as Bandit 
 Rutger Nygren as 	Member of the audience at the lecture
 Yngve Nyqvist as 	Member of the audience at the lecture
 Nils Poppe as 	Skogens Konung 
 Manetta Ryberg as 	Lena's friend at Den Gyldene Freden 
 Robert Ryberg as 	Guest at Den Gyldene Freden 
 Stina Seelig as 	Woman 
 Georg Skarstedt as 	Jester
 Harald Svensson as 	Board member 
 Nils Wahlbom as 	Guest at Den Gyldene Freden / Bandit 
 Tor Wallén as 	Knight at Ankarshus 
 Harald Wehlnor as 	Man 
 Ragnar Widestedt as Board member

References

Bibliography 
 Larsson, Mariah & Marklund, Anders. Swedish Film: An Introduction and Reader. Nordic Academic Press, 2010.

External links 
 

1937 films
1937 comedy films
1930s Swedish-language films
Films directed by Sigurd Wallén
Swedish black-and-white films
Films set in Stockholm
Swedish historical comedy films
1930s historical comedy films
1930s Swedish films